Aliabad (also Romanized as ‘Alīābād) is a village in Tabas-e Masina Rural District, Gazik District, Darmian County, South Khorasan Province, Iran. At the 2006 census, its population was 515, in 116 families.

References 

Populated places in Darmian County